Jennifer A. Homans (born 1960) is an American historian, author, and dance critic. Her book Apollo's Angels: A History of Ballet was a finalist for the National Book Critics Circle Award in 2010.

Early life and education
Homans was raised in Chicago, Illinois, where she trained as a ballerina from the age of eight. By the time she was a teenager, Homans had enrolled in dance classes at the University of Chicago and eventually left the state for more serious training at the University of North Carolina School of the Arts and School of American Ballet. After dancing professionally with the Pacific Northwest Ballet, Homans decided to enroll in Columbia University at the age of 26. After earning her Bachelor of Arts degree in French literature, she enrolled in New York University (NYU) for her PhD in Modern European History.

Career
Following her PhD, Homans accepted a position as a Distinguished Scholar in Residence at NYU, where she wrote her first book, Apollo's Angels: A History of Ballet. Apollo's Angels traced back the origins of ballet from the Renaissance to modern times. The book was described by The New York Times as "the only truly definitive history of ballet". It was a finalist for the National Book Critics Circle Award and was named as one of the "10 Best Books of 2010" by the New York Times. Homans' claim that ballet is a dying art form generated controversy. Art critic Claudia La Rocco rebuffed Homans' claims and critiqued the book for its alleged lack of attention to post-George Balanchine developments in ballet, including William Forsythe.

From 2012 to 2013, Homans was granted a Guggenheim Fellowship as she began writing her second book, a history of George Balanchine. The following year, she established the Center for Ballet and the Arts at NYU with funding from the Andrew W. Mellon Foundation to help "establish ballet as a serious subject of academic inquiry." In its inaugural cohort, the institute accepted seven fellows; John Carrafa, Gregory Mosher, J. David Velleman, Heather Watts, Frederick Wiseman, Christopher d'Amboise, and John Michael Schert.

In 2016, Homans was selected as a Fellow of the New York Public Library's Dorothy and Lewis B. Cullman Center for Scholars and Writers. In 2019, Homans' Center for Ballet and the Arts received a three-year $2 million grant. She was also named The New Yorker's dance critic, replacing Joan Acocella.

She was named a fellow of the American Academy of Arts and Sciences in 2021. Her 2022 book Mr. B  was a finalist for the 2023 National Book Critics Circle award in biography.

Personal life
Homans married Tony Judt, with whom she had two children.

Bibliography

Books

Selected articles and papers

References

Living people
1948 births
American ballerinas
Historians from Illinois
American women historians
American women non-fiction writers
New York University alumni
School of American Ballet alumni
University of North Carolina School of the Arts alumni
Columbia College (New York) alumni
Writers from Chicago
Fellows of the American Academy of Arts and Sciences